"Nimble Bastard" is a single by American rock band Incubus, off of their eighth studio album 8. It peaked at number 4 on the Billboard Mainstream Rock Songs chart in April 2017.

Background
Guitarist Mike Einziger mentioned that the song was conceived very late in the album creation process, being written spontaneously while already working on recording sessions in the studio. He reflected that: "we were messing around with this musical idea and the next thing we know we had a song." Lyrics were written by lead vocalist Brandon Boyd. The track was not one of the tracks from the album to be produced by Skrillex, though he did provide the song final mix.

The song was debuted on KROQ on February 16, 2017. The band premiered a lyric video for the track the following day, featuring a film reel that presented the song's lyrics across a number of various backdrops and landscapes, until the reel burns, revealing nothing but a brick wall. A music video for the song was released on April 7, 2017, and featured the band being attacked by dogs with jet packs and, in retaliation, band members transform into super hero cats to fight back.

Composition and themes
Loudwire described the song as "Incubus in a heavier mood", stating the song features "an immediate energy with the full band coming in together right at the start, including the vocals. The slightly subdued introduction gives way to a bobbing energy that crashes into the positively sublime chorus" and concluding that "Soaring hooks dominate 'Nimble Bastard', making it one of the catchiest songs in the band’s discography. Lyrically, Boyd states he wrote the song about people he was inspired by people's adaptability, and ability to recover from negative life situations against difficult odds. However, the lyrics lead many to misinterpret them to be an allegory for the political climate in the United States after the United States Presidential Election of 2016, in which Donald Trump was elected over Hillary Clinton. He clarified the situation, explaining:

Radio.com pointed out that similar misconceptions had arisen from the band's 2004 single "Megalomaniac", of which many listeners misinterpreted its lyrics to be about then-president George W. Bush.

Reception
Loudwire named the song the 25th-best hard rock song of 2017.

Personnel
 Brandon Boyd – lead vocals
 Michael Einziger – guitar
 Ben Kenney – bass guitar, backing vocals
 Chris Kilmore – synthesizers
 Jose Pasillas II – drums

Charts

Weekly charts

Year-end charts

References

2017 singles
Incubus (band) songs
2017 songs
Island Records singles
Songs written by Ben Kenney
Songs written by Brandon Boyd
Songs written by Mike Einziger
Songs written by Chris Kilmore
Songs written by José Pasillas